Gaspari is a surname. Notable people with the surname include:

 Annibale de Gasparis (1819–1892), Italian astronomer
 Diana Gaspari (born 1984), Italian curler
 Elio Gaspari (born 1944), Brazilian journalist and writer resident in São Paulo
 Fabio de Gaspari (born 1966), Italian javelin thrower
 Gaetano Gaspari (1807/8–1881), Italian composer, bibliographer, and historian of music
 Gianfranco Gaspari, Italian bobsledder who competed from the late 1960s to the early 1970s
 Giuseppe Gaspari (born 1932), Italian professional football player
 Maksim Gaspari (1883–1980), Slovene painter
 Mitja Gaspari (born 1951), Slovenian economist, banker, and politician
 Pietro Gaspari (1720–1785), Italian artist, known for veduta and cappricio in etchings and paintings
 Rich Gaspari (born 1963), American former professional bodybuilder from 1980s and early 1990s
 Remo Gaspari (1921–2011), Italian politician, who was several times minister of the Italian Republic

See also
 16973 Gaspari, main-belt asteroid
 4279 De Gasparis, main-belt asteroid